The Slovenian Open was a golf tournament on the Challenge Tour and the Alps Tour, played in Slovenia. It was held from 1997 to 1999 on the Challenge Tour, at the Bled Golf Club in Bled. From 2008 to 2012 it was played on the Alps Tour at the Ptuj Golf Club in Ptuj.

Winners

Notes

References

External links
Coverage on the Challenge Tour's official site

Former Challenge Tour events
Golf tournaments in Slovenia
Recurring sporting events established in 1997
Recurring sporting events disestablished in 1999